Princess Hirut Desta (also Princess Ruth Desta) was the daughter of Ras Desta Damtew and Princess Tenagnework Haile Selassie, and granddaughter of Emperor Haile Selassie of Ethiopia. She was the widow of General Nega Tegegn, who was governor of the provinces of Begemder and Semien. She was described by Nathaniel T. Kenney as a "trim, most democratic of princesses," who "was not above grabbing a tool from a workman, I suspect, and showing him how to use it."

Princess Hirut was educated at the School of St Clare (renamed Bolitho School), Penzance, Cornwall, and at Clarendon School for Girls, Abergele, North Wales.

She was imprisoned by the Derg from 1974 until 1988. Princess Hirut Desta died in London aged 84 in 2014, and her funeral was conducted at the Holy Trinity Cathedral in Addis Ababa.

Patronages
 President of the Committee for the Restoration of the Churches of Lalibela.

Honours

National honours
 Dame Grand Cordon of the Order of the Queen of Sheba.
 Imperial Coronation Medal (1930).
 Jubilee Medal (1955).
 Jubilee Medal (1966).

Ancestry

References

1930 births
2014 deaths
Ethiopian Royal Family
Ethiopian princesses
People educated at Clarendon School for Girls